Procopius is a genus of African corinnid sac spiders first described by Tamerlan Thorell in 1899.

Species
 it contains eleven species:
Procopius aeneolus Simon, 1903 – Equatorial Guinea
Procopius aethiops Thorell, 1899 (type) – Cameroon
Procopius affinis Lessert, 1946 – Congo
Procopius ensifer Simon, 1910 – West Africa, Equatorial Guinea (Bioko)
Procopius gentilis Simon, 1910 – West Africa
Procopius granulosus Simon, 1903 – Equatorial Guinea (Bioko, Mbini), Cameroon
Procopius g. helluo Simon, 1910 – Equatorial Guinea (Bioko)
Procopius laticeps Simon, 1910 – Equatorial Guinea (Bioko)
Procopius lesserti (Strand, 1916) – Congo, Rwanda
Procopius luteifemur Schmidt, 1956 – Cameroon
Procopius vittatus Thorell, 1899 – Cameroon

References

Araneomorphae genera
Corinnidae
Taxa named by Tamerlan Thorell